Jorge José Castillo Casalderrey (born June 16, 1933) is a Spanish-born painter and sculptor.
 
For most of his childhood, he and his family lived in Argentina.  Since 1962, he has maintained residences in both Barcelona and New York City.

Castillo greatly admired Pablo Picasso, and that influence shows in his paintings, etchings, and lithographs.

His steel sculpture Homage to the Cyclist stands in the Plaça de Sants in Barcelona.

References

20th-century Spanish painters
Spanish male painters
21st-century Spanish painters
Cubist artists
1933 births
Living people
20th-century Spanish sculptors
20th-century Spanish male artists
Spanish male sculptors
21st-century Spanish male artists